Fernando Javier Solabarrieta Chelech (born December 18, 1970 in Puerto Natales, Chile) is a Chilean television journalist, known for his role as anchor man on several sport events for TVN, like "Zoom Deportivo". He is of Basque descent since is father is Spanish and of Arab (Palestinian) origin on his mother's side. He is married to journalist and TV host Ivette Vergara and they have three children: Nicolás, Iñaki and Maite.

On 2011 he started working as anchor man for Fox Sports (cable TV station), which is also his current job. In March 2015, he left TVN after serving for 22 years.

On August 6, 2015 he joined Mega to his sports channel area to tell the parties of the Chile national team in the World Cup Qualifying course Russia 2018.

Filmography

TV shows
 Zoom Deportivo (2008–present)
 Había Una Vez (2011)
 Levantando la Copa (2011)

References

External links
 Latercera.com

1970 births
Male journalists
Chilean television presenters
Chilean people of Basque descent
Chilean people of Palestinian descent
Chilean people of Syrian descent
Living people
People from Puerto Natales
Chilean sports journalists
Televisión Nacional de Chile play-by-play commentators
Televisión Nacional de Chile color commentators
Fox Sports Chile play-by-play commentators
Chilean television personalities